Retribution Gospel Choir is an indie rock band based in Duluth, Minnesota.  Current members of the band include Alan Sparhawk (guitar, vocals, sampler) and Steve Garrington (bass), both of whom are also in the band Low, and Eric Pollard (drums, vocals). Despite sharing the majority of their members, RGC's high-energy performance differs greatly from Low's subdued, minimalist feel. 

Until 2008, Matt Livingston, also bassist with Low, played bass for the band.  Sparhawk's wife and Low bandmate Mimi Parker appears on vocals on one Retribution Gospel Choir track.

Discography

Studio albums
Retribution Gospel Choir (2008)
2 (2010)
3 (2013)

EPs
The Revolution EP (2012)

Appear on
Twin Town High, Music Yearbook Volume 09 (2007)
Leak- Volume #5 (2008)

Musicians
 Alan Sparhawk - vocals, guitar
 Eric Pollard - drums, vocals
 Steve Garrington - bass
 Mimi Parker - vocals on "Breaker"
 Matt Livingston - bass (2007–2008)

References

External links

http://www.discogs.com/artist/Retribution+Gospel+Choir
http://www.last.fm/music/Retribution+Gospel+Choir

Indie rock musical groups from Minnesota
American musical trios
Musical groups established in 2007
Sub Pop artists